Yarranton is an English surname. Notable people with this name include:

 Peter Yarranton, chairman of the United Kingdom Sports Council from 1989 to 1994, and a notable figure
 Andrew Yarranton, English engineer in the 17th century

See also 
 Yarran

 

English-language surnames